Barachevo is a rural locality (a village) in Kubenskoye Rural Settlement, Vologodsky District, Vologda Oblast, Russia. The population was 5 as of 2002.

Geography 
The distance to Vologda is 36.5 km, to Kubenskoye is 6.5 km. Khripelovo, Kryukovo, Khvastovo are the nearest rural localities.

References 

Rural localities in Vologodsky District